Lezhë or Lezha is a city in central Albania.

Lezhë or Lezha may also refer to:

 Lezhë County, first-level administrative division of Albania
 Lezhë District, second-level administrative division of Albania
 Lezha, a river in Russia